Ye Olde Cock Tavern is a Grade II listed public house at 22 Fleet Street, London EC4. It is part of the Taylor Walker Pubs group.

Originally built before the 17th century, it was rebuilt, including the interior (which is thought to include work by carver Grinling Gibbons), on the other side of the road in the 1880s when a branch of the Bank of England was built where it stood.
However, in the 1990s a fire broke out and destroyed many of the original ornaments, and the building has since gone through a restoration using photographs.

In 1930 the founding meeting of the Society of Industrial Artists, later renamed Society of Industrial Artists and Designers and now the Chartered Society of Designers, was held at the Olde Cock Tavern, and attendees included Sir Misha Black and Milner Gray.

It was frequented by Samuel Pepys, Alfred Tennyson and Charles Dickens.

The Olde Cocke has also become the meeting place for the world's oldest free speech society, or debating club, Cogers on each second Monday of the month.  In addition, the Sylvan Debating Club meets there on the first Monday of the month.

References

External links

Official website

Grade II listed pubs in the City of London